Michael J. Colburn (born 1964,Virginia) is the Director of Bands at Butler University and was the 27th Director of the United States Marine Band and a colonel in the Marine Corps. Colburn joined "The President's Own" Marine Band in 1987 as a euphonium player and became the band's director in 2004.  Colburn is a native of St. Albans, Vermont, and graduated from Bellows Free Academy there in 1982.  He attended Crane School of Music at SUNY Potsdam for two years before transferring to Arizona State University, where he earned his bachelor's degree in music performance in 1986.  He received his master's degree in conducting from George Mason University in 1991.

As Director of the Marine Band, Colburn conducted the group's performances at high-level state events including United States presidential inaugurations, state funerals and state arrival ceremonies.

Colburn retired his commission on 12 July 2014. He was succeeded by Lieutenant Colonel Jason Fettig.

Colburn is currently the director of bands at Butler University in Indianapolis.

Awards
Navy Distinguished Service Medal
Legion of Merit
Army Achievement Medal
Navy Unit Commendation
Meritorious Unit Commendation (3 awards)
Marine Corps Good Conduct Medal (3 awards)
National Defense Service Medal (2 awards)
Global War on Terrorism Service Medal

References

1964 births
Living people
United States Marine Corps colonels
Butler University faculty
American male musicians
United States Marine Band musicians